The Inini or Grand Inini is a river in western French Guiana. It is a tributary of the Lawa, the upper course of the Maroni. The Inini is the only major river in French Guiana which runs east to west, unlike the other major rivers which run south to north. In the beginning of the 20th century, it was the site of a gold rush, and the gold prospectors have become active in the region again since the 1990s. The Inini territory which has existed between 1930 and 1946 was named after this river.

References

Rivers of French Guiana
Rivers of France